Robert Huffman (born March 12, 1968) is an American former stock car racing driver from Claremont, North Carolina. He drove in eleven NASCAR Busch Series between 1991 and 1993. He next raced two NASCAR Craftsman Truck Series races in 1997. He returned to the series full-time in 2004; that year he had six Top 10 finishes in 24 (of 25) events to finish 23rd in season points. He most recently drove the No. 12 Toyota Tundra in 2005; he raced in 14 events with two Top 10 finishes.

He also won five championships in NASCAR's Goody's Dash Series. He is also known for campaigning a Toyota on that series, becoming the first successful driver using a Toyota in any NASCAR series.

Personal life
Huffman's son, Landon Huffman, currently competes in NASCAR, driving part-time in the Truck and ARCA Series since 2016.

Motorsports career results

NASCAR
(key) (Bold – Pole position awarded by qualifying time. Italics – Pole position earned by points standings or practice time. * – Most laps led.)

Busch Series

Craftsman Truck Series

ARCA Permatex SuperCar Series
(key) (Bold – Pole position awarded by qualifying time. Italics – Pole position earned by points standings or practice time. * – Most laps led.)

References

External links
 
 

Living people
1968 births
People from Catawba County, North Carolina
Racing drivers from North Carolina
NASCAR drivers
ISCARS Dash Touring Series drivers
ARCA Menards Series drivers